Keith Henderson may refer to:
 Keith Henderson (American football)
 Keith Henderson (artist)